Blue Army may refer to:

 Blue Army (Poland), the Polish army unit 
 Blue Army (Russia), the armed peasant group
 Blue Army of Our Lady of Fátima, the Catholic lay organization 
 Blue Army (Aerosmith), Aerosmith fans
 Leicester City F.C., nickname for the football club

See also
 Black Army (disambiguation)